Manokotak Airport  is a state-owned public-use airport located one mile (2 km) north of the central business district of Manokotak, a city in the Dillingham Census Area of the U.S. state of Alaska.

Although most U.S. airports use the same three-letter location identifier for the FAA and IATA, Manokotak Airport is assigned MBA by the FAA and KMO by the IATA (which assigned MBA to Moi International Airport in Mombasa, Kenya).

Facilities and aircraft 
Manokotak Airport has one runway designated 1/19 with a 2,720 x 60 ft (829 x 18 m) gravel surface. For the 12-month period ending December 31, 2001, the airport had 1,200 aircraft operations: 83% air taxi and 17% general aviation.

Airlines and destinations

References

External links 
 FAA Alaska airport diagram (GIF)
 

Airports in the Dillingham Census Area, Alaska